The Gospel of Mark is the second of the four canonical gospels and one of the three synoptic Gospels. It tells of the ministry of Jesus from his baptism by John the Baptist to his death, burial, and the discovery of his empty tomb. It portrays Jesus as a teacher, an exorcist, a healer, and a miracle worker, though it does not expound upon the miraculous birth or divine pre-existence. He refers to himself as the Son of Man. He is called the Son of God but keeps his messianic nature secret; even his disciples fail to understand him. All this is in keeping with Christian interpretation of prophecy, which is believed to foretell the fate of the messiah as suffering servant. 

Early church tradition teaches that the gospel of Mark was written in Rome by Mark, a follower and interpreter of Peter. Most scholars, on the other hand, believe that Mark was written anonymously for a gentile audience, probably in Rome, sometime shortly before or after the destruction of the Second Temple in 70 AD.

The gospel has been variously dated between 35 and 74 AD, with the majority of scholars placing it between 66 and 74 AD—shortly before or after the destruction of the Second Temple in 70 AD.

Composition

Authorship and Date
Early Christian tradition, first attested by Papias of Hierapolis (c.60-c.130 AD), attributes authorship to Mark, a follower and interpreter of Peter. Likewise, according to Clement of Alexandria (c. 150-215), after Peter had preached to the Imperial equites in Rome, Mark left a written record so that they might be able to commit the teachings to memory. Eusebius of Caesarea says it was written in the third year of Emperor Claudius, though a range of dates between 35 and 45 AD are sometimes proposed.

Most scholars usually dismiss the earlier dates, holding that the gospel was written anonymously and that the name Mark was later attached as an attempt to link the gospel to an authoritative figure. They posit that the author used a variety of pre-existing sources, such as conflict stories, apocalyptic discourse, miracle stories, parables, a passian narrative, and collections of sayings (although not the Gospel of Thomas and probably not the Q source) that the author was first to compile. Its composition is usually dated through the eschatological discourse in Mark 13, which scholars interpret as pointing to the First Jewish–Roman War (66–74 AD)—a war that lead to the destruction of the Second Temple in AD 70. This would place the composition of Mark either immediately after the destruction, which is supported by most scholars, or during the years immediately prior.

Setting
The Gospel of Mark was written in Greek, for a gentile audience, and probably in Rome, although Galilee, Antioch (third-largest city in the Roman Empire, located in northern Syria), and southern Syria have also been suggested. 

The consensus among modern scholars is that the gospels are a subset of the ancient genre of bios, or ancient biography. Ancient biographies were concerned with providing examples for readers to emulate while preserving and promoting the subject's reputation and memory, and also included morals, rhetoric, propaganda and kerygma (preaching) in their works. Like all the synoptic gospels, the purpose of writing was to strengthen the faith of those who already believed, as opposed to serving as a tractate for missionary conversion. Christian churches were small communities of believers, often based on households (an autocratic patriarch plus extended family, slaves, freedmen, and other clients), and the evangelists often wrote on two levels: one the "historical" presentation of the story of Jesus, the other dealing with the concerns of the author's own day. Thus the proclamation of Jesus in Mark 1:14 and the following verses, for example, mixes the terms Jesus would have used as a 1st-century Jew ("kingdom of God") and those of the early church ("believe", "gospel"). 

Christianity began within Judaism, with a Christian "church" (or ἐκκλησία, ekklesia, meaning "assembly") that arose shortly after Jesus's death, when some of his followers claimed to have witnessed him risen from the dead. From the outset, Christians depended heavily on Jewish literature, supporting their convictions through the Jewish scriptures. Those convictions involved a nucleus of key concepts: the messiah, the son of God and the son of man, the suffering servant, the Day of the Lord, and the kingdom of God. Uniting these ideas was the common thread of apocalyptic expectation: Both Jews and Christians believed that the end of history was at hand, that God would very soon come to punish their enemies and establish his own rule, and that they were at the centre of his plans. Christians read the Jewish scripture as a figure or type of Jesus Christ, so that the goal of Christian literature became an experience of the living Christ. The new movement spread around the eastern Mediterranean and to Rome and further west, and assumed a distinct identity, although the groups within it remained extremely diverse.

Synoptic problem

Up until the 19th century the gospel of Mark was traditionally placed second, and sometimes fourth, in the Christian canon, as an abridgement of Matthew; the Church has consequently derived its view of Jesus primarily from Matthew, secondarily from John, and only distantly from Mark.

However, in the 19th century, Mark came to be viewed by many scholars as the earliest of the four gospels, and as a source used by both Matthew and Luke. The gospels of Matthew, Mark and Luke bear a striking resemblance to each other, so much so that their contents can easily be set side by side in parallel columns. The fact that they share so much material verbatim and yet also exhibit important differences has led to a number of hypotheses explaining their interdependence, a phenomenon termed the synoptic problem. It is widely accepted that this was the first gospel (Marcan Priority) and was used as a source by both Matthew and Luke, who agree with each other in their sequence of stories and events only when they also agree with Mark. The hypothesis of Marcan priority continues to be held by the majority of scholars today, and there is a new recognition of the author as an artist and theologian using a range of literary devices to convey his conception of Jesus as the authoritative yet suffering Son of God.

Historicity
In the 19th century it became widely accepted that Mark was the earliest of the gospels; it was assumed that it was therefore the most reliable source for the historical Jesus, but since about 1950 there has been a growing consensus that the primary purpose of the author of Mark was to announce a message rather than to report history. The idea that the gospel could be used to reconstruct the historical Jesus suffered two severe blows in the early part of the 20th century, first when William Wrede argued strongly that the "Messianic secret" motif in Mark was a creation of the early church rather than a reflection of the historical Jesus, and in 1919 when Karl Ludwig Schmidt further undermined its historicity with his contention that the links between episodes are the invention of the writer, meaning that it cannot be taken as a reliable guide to the chronology of Jesus' mission: both claims are widely accepted today. The gospel is nevertheless still seen as the most reliable of the four in terms of its overall description of Jesus's life and ministry.

Structure and content

Structure
There is no agreement on the structure of Mark. There is, however, a widely recognised break at Mark 8:26–31: before 8:26 there are numerous miracle stories, the action is in Galilee, and Jesus preaches to the crowds, while after 8:31 there are hardly any miracles, the action shifts from Galilee to gentile areas or hostile Judea, and Jesus teaches the disciples. Peter's confession at Mark 8:27–30 that Jesus is the messiah thus forms the watershed to the whole gospel. A further generally recognised turning point comes at the end of chapter 10, when Jesus and his followers arrive in Jerusalem and the foreseen confrontation with the Temple authorities begins, leading R.T. France to characterise Mark as a three-act drama. James Edwards in his 2002 commentary points out that the gospel can be seen as a series of questions asking first who Jesus is (the answer being that he is the messiah), then what form his mission takes (a mission of suffering culminating in the crucifixion and resurrection, events only to be understood when the questions are answered), while another scholar, C. Myers, has made what Edwards calls a "compelling case" for recognising the incidents of Jesus' baptism, transfiguration and crucifixion, at the beginning, middle and end of the gospel, as three key moments, each with common elements, and each portrayed in an apocalyptic light. Stephen H. Smith has made the point that the structure of Mark is similar to the structure of a Greek tragedy.

Content
 Jesus is first announced as the Messiah and then later as the Son of God; he is baptised by John and a heavenly voice announces him as the Son of God; he is tested in the wilderness by Satan; John is arrested, and Jesus begins to preach the good news of the kingdom of God.
 Jesus gathers his disciples; he begins teaching, driving out demons, healing the sick, cleansing lepers, raising the dead, feeding the hungry, and giving sight to the blind; he delivers a long discourse in parables to the crowd, intended for the disciples, but they fail to understand; he performs mighty works, calming the storm and walking on water, but while God and demons recognise him, neither the crowds nor the disciples grasp his identity. He also has several run-ins with Jewish law keepers especially in chapters 2–3.
 Jesus asks the disciples who people say he is, and then, "but you, who do you say I am?" Peter answers that he is the Christ, and Jesus commands him to silence; Jesus explains that the Son of Man must go to Jerusalem and be killed, but will rise again; Moses and Elijah appear with Jesus and God tells the disciples, "This is my son," but they remain uncomprehending.
 Jesus goes to Jerusalem, where he is hailed as one who "comes in the name of the Lord" and will inaugurate the "kingdom of David"; he drives those who buy and sell animals from the Temple and debates with the Jewish authorities; on the Mount of Olives he announces the coming destruction of the Temple, the persecution of his followers, and the coming of the Son of Man in power and glory.
 A woman perfumes Jesus' head with oil, and Jesus explains that this is a sign of his coming death; Jesus celebrates Passover with the disciples, declares the bread and wine to be his body and blood, and goes with them to Gethsemane to pray; there Judas betrays him to the Jewish authorities.  Interrogated by the high priest, Jesus says that he is the Christ, the Son of God, and will return as Son of Man at God's right hand.  The Jewish leaders turn him over to Pilate, who has him crucified as one who claims to be "king of the Jews"; Jesus, abandoned by the disciples, is buried in a rock tomb by a sympathetic member of the Jewish council.
 The women who have followed Jesus come to the tomb on Sunday morning; they find it empty, and are told by a young man in a white robe to go and tell the others that Jesus has risen and has gone before them to Galilee; "but they said nothing to anyone, for they were afraid".

Ending

The earliest extant Greek manuscripts of Mark, codices Vaticanus (which contains a blank column) and Sinaiticus, end at Mark 16:8, with the women fleeing in fear from the empty tomb. The majority of recent scholars believe this to be the original ending, and that this is supported by statements from the early Church Fathers Eusebius and Jerome. They maintain that this is evidenced by the presence of two alternate endings, which may have been written to supply a more satisfactory conclusion. A few manuscripts have what is called the "shorter ending," an addition to Mark 16:8 telling how the women told "those around Peter" all that the angel had commanded and how the message of eternal life (or "proclamation of eternal salvation") was then sent out by Jesus himself. This addition differs from the rest of Mark both in style and in its understanding of Jesus. The overwhelming majority of manuscripts have the "longer ending", possibly written in the early 2nd century and added later in the same century, with accounts of the resurrected Jesus, the commissioning of the disciples to proclaim the gospel, and Christ's ascension.

Theology

Gospel
The author introduces his work as "gospel", meaning "good news", a literal translation of the Greek "evangelion"he uses the word more often than any other writer in the New Testament except Paul. Paul uses it to mean "the good news (of the saving significance of the death and resurrection) of Christ"; Mark extends it to the career of Christ as well as his death and resurrection. Like the other gospels, Mark was written to confirm the identity of Jesus as eschatological delivererthe purpose of terms such as "messiah" and "son of God". As in all the gospels, the messianic identity of Jesus is supported by a number of themes, including: (1) the depiction of his disciples as obtuse, fearful and uncomprehending; (2) the refutation of the charge made by Jesus' enemies that he was a magician; (3) secrecy surrounding his true identity (this last is missing from John).

The failure of the disciples
In Mark, the disciples, especially the Twelve, move from lack of perception of Jesus to rejection of the "way of suffering" to flight and denialeven the women who received the first proclamation of his resurrection can be seen as failures for not reporting the good news. There is much discussion of this theme among scholars. Some argue that the author of Mark was using the disciples to correct "erroneous" views in his own community concerning the reality of the suffering messiah, others that it is an attack on the Jerusalem branch of the church for resisting the extension of the gospel to the gentiles, or a mirror of the convert's usual experience of the initial enthusiasm followed by growing awareness of the necessity for suffering. It certainly reflects the strong theme in Mark of Jesus as the "suffering just one" portrayed in so many of the books of the Jewish scriptures, from Jeremiah to Job and the Psalms, but especially in the "Suffering Servant" passages in Isaiah. It also reflects the Jewish scripture theme of God's love being met by infidelity and failure, only to be renewed by God. The failure of the disciples and Jesus' denial by Peter himself would have been powerful symbols of faith, hope and reconciliation for Christians.

The charge of magic
Mark contains twenty accounts of miracles and healings, accounting for almost a third of the gospel and half of the first ten chapters, more, proportionally, than in any other gospel. In the gospels as a whole, Jesus' miracles, prophecies, etc., are presented as evidence of God's rule, but Mark's descriptions of Jesus' healings are a partial exception to this, as his methods, using spittle to heal blindness and magic formulae, were those of a magician. This is the charge the Jewish religious leaders bring against Jesus: they say he is performing exorcisms with the aid of an evil spirit and calling up the spirit of John the Baptist. "There was [...] no period in the history of the [Roman] empire in which the magician was not considered an enemy of society," subject to penalties ranging from exile to death, says Classical scholar Ramsay MacMullen. All the gospels defend Jesus against the charge, which, if true, would contradict their ultimate claims for him. The point of the Beelzebub incident in Mark is to set forth Jesus' claims to be an instrument of God, not Satan.

Messianic secret

In 1901, William Wrede identified the "Messianic secret"Jesus' secrecy about his identity as the messiahas one of Mark's central themes. Wrede argued that the elements of the secretJesus' silencing of the demons, the obtuseness of the disciples regarding his identity, and the concealment of the truth inside parableswere fictions and arose from the tension between the Church's post-resurrection messianic belief and the historical reality of Jesus. There remains continuing debate over how far the "secret" originated with Mark and how far he got it from tradition, and how far, if at all, it represents the self-understanding and practices of the historical Jesus.

Christology

Christology means a doctrine or understanding concerning the person or nature of Christ. In the New Testament writings it is frequently conveyed through the titles applied to Jesus. Most scholars agree that "Son of God" is the most important of these titles in Mark. It appears on the lips of God himself at the baptism and the transfiguration, and is Jesus' own self-designation. These and other instances provide reliable evidence of how the evangelist perceived Jesus, but it is not clear just what the title meant to Mark and his 1st century audience. Where it appears in the Hebrew scriptures it meant Israel as God's people, or the king at his coronation, or angels, as well as the suffering righteous man. In Hellenistic culture the same phrase meant a "divine man", a supernatural being. There is little evidence that "son of God" was a title for the messiah in 1st century Judaism, and the attributes which Mark describes in Jesus are much more those of the Hellenistic miracle-working "divine man" than of the Jewish Davidic messiah.

Mark does not explicitly state what he means by "Son of God", nor when the sonship was conferred. The New Testament as a whole presents four different understandings:
 Jesus became God's son at his resurrection, God "begetting" Jesus to a new life by raising him from the deadthis was the earliest understanding, preserved in Paul's Epistle to the Romans, 1:3–4, and in Acts 13:33;
 Jesus became God's son at his baptism, the coming of the Holy Spirit marking him as messiah, while "Son of God" refers to the relationship then established for him by Godthis is the understanding implied in Mark 1:9–11; 
 Matthew and Luke present Jesus as "Son of God" from the moment of conception and birth, with God taking the place of a human father;
 John, the last of the gospels, presents the idea that the Christ was pre-existent and became flesh as Jesusan idea also found in Paul.

However, other scholars dispute this interpretation and instead hold that Jesus is already presented as God's son even before his baptism in Mark.

Mark also calls Jesus "christos" (Christ), translating the Hebrew "messiah," (anointed person). In the Old Testament the term messiah ("anointed one") described prophets, priests and kings; by the time of Jesus, with the kingdom long vanished, it had come to mean an eschatological king (a king who would come at the end of time), one who would be entirely human though far greater than all God's previous messengers to Israel, endowed with miraculous powers, free from sin, ruling in justice and glory (as described in, for example, the Psalms of Solomon, a Jewish work from this period). The most important occurrences are in the context of Jesus' death and suffering, suggesting that, for Mark, Jesus can only be fully understood in that context.

A third important title, "Son of Man", has its roots in Ezekiel, the Book of Enoch, (a popular Jewish apocalyptic work of the period), and especially in Daniel 7:13–14, where the Son of Man is assigned royal roles of dominion, kingship and glory. Mark 14:62 combines more scriptural allusions: before he comes on clouds the Son of Man will be seated on the right hand of God, pointing to the equivalence of the three titles, Christ, Son of God, Son of Man, the common element being the reference to kingly power.

Christ's death, resurrection and return
Eschatology means the study of the end-times, and the Jews expected the messiah to be an eschatological figure, a deliverer who would appear at the end of the age to usher in an earthly kingdom. The earliest Jewish Christian community saw Jesus as a messiah in this Jewish sense, a human figure appointed by God as his earthly regent; but they also believed in Jesus' resurrection and exaltation to heaven, and for this reason they also viewed him as God's agent (the "son of God") who would return in glory ushering in the Kingdom of God.

The term "Son of God" likewise had a specific Jewish meaning, or range of meanings, one of the most significant being the earthly king adopted by God as his son at his enthronement, legitimising his rule over Israel. In Hellenistic culture, in contrast, the phrase meant a "divine man", covering legendary heroes like Hercules, god-kings like the Egyptian pharaohs, or famous philosophers like Plato. When the gospels call Jesus "Son of God" the intention is to place him in the class of Hellenistic and Greek divine men, the "sons of God" who were endowed with supernatural power to perform healings, exorcisms and other wonderful deeds. Mark's "Son of David" is Hellenistic, his Jesus predicting that his mission involves suffering, death and resurrection, and, by implication, not military glory and conquest. This reflects a move away from the Jewish-Christian apocalyptic tradition and towards the Hellenistic message preached by Paul, for whom Christ's death and resurrection, rather than the establishment of the apocalyptic Jewish kingdom, is the meaning of salvation, the "gospel".

Comparison with other writings

Mark and the New Testament
All four gospels tell a story in which Jesus' death and resurrection are the crucial redemptive events. There are, however, important differences between the four: Unlike John, Mark never calls Jesus "God", or claims that Jesus existed prior to his earthly life; unlike Matthew and Luke, the author does not mention a virgin birth, and apparently believes that Jesus had a normal human parentage and birth; unlike Matthew and Luke, he makes no attempt to trace Jesus' ancestry back to King David or Adam with a genealogy.

Christians of Mark's time expected Jesus to return as Messiah in their own lifetimeMark, like the other gospels, attributes the promise to Jesus himself, and it is reflected in the Pauline Epistles, the Epistle of James, the Epistle to the Hebrews and in the Book of Revelation. When return failed, the early Christians revised their understanding. Some acknowledged that the Second Coming had been delayed, but still expected it; others redefined the focus of the promise, the Gospel of John, for example, speaking of "eternal life" as something available in the present; while still others concluded that Jesus would not return at all (the Second Epistle of Peter argues against those who held this view).

Mark's despairing death of Jesus was changed to a more victorious one in subsequent gospels. Mark's Christ dies with the cry, "My God, my God, why have you forsaken me?"; Matthew, the next gospel to be written, repeats this word for word but manages to make clear that Jesus's death is the beginning of the resurrection of Israel; Luke has a still more positive picture, replacing Mark's (and Matthew's) cry of despair with one of submission to God's will ("Father, into your hands I commend my spirit"); while John, the last gospel, has Jesus dying without apparent suffering in fulfillment of the divine plan.

Content unique to Mark

 The Sabbath was made for man, not man for the Sabbath.  Not present in either Matthew 12:1–8 or Luke 6:1–5. This is also a so-called "Western non-interpolation". The passage is not found in the Western text of Mark.
 People were saying, "[Jesus] has gone out of his mind", see also Rejection of Jesus.
 Mark is the only gospel with the combination of verses in Mark 4:24–25: the other gospels split them up, Mark 4:24 being found in Luke 6:38 and Matthew 7:2, Mark 4:25 in Matthew 13:12 and Matthew 25:29, Luke 8:18 and Luke 19:26.
The Parable of the Growing Seed.
 Only Mark counts the possessed swine; there are about two thousand.
 Two consecutive healing stories of women; both make use of the number twelve.
 Only Mark gives healing commands of Jesus in the (presumably original) Aramaic: Talitha koum, Ephphatha. See Aramaic of Jesus.
 Only place in the New Testament where Jesus is referred to as "the son of Mary".
 Mark is the only gospel where Jesus himself is called a carpenter; in Matthew he is called a carpenter's son.
 Only place that both names his brothers and mentions his sisters; Matthew has a slightly different name for one brother.
 The taking of a staff and sandals is permitted in Mark 6:8–9 but prohibited in Matthew 10:9–10 and Luke 9:3.
 Only Mark refers to Herod Antipas as a king; Matthew and Luke refer to him (more properly) as a tetrarch.
 The longest version of the story of Herodias' daughter's dance and the beheading of John the Baptist.
 Mark's literary cycles:
 6:30–44Feeding of the five thousand;
 6:45–56Crossing of the lake;
 7:1–13Dispute with the Pharisees;
 7:14–23Discourse on Defilement
Then:
 8:1–9Feeding of the four thousand;
 8:10Crossing of the lake;
 8:11–13Dispute with the Pharisees;
 8:14–21Incident of no bread and discourse about the leaven of the Pharisees.
 Customs that at that time were unique to Jews are explained (hand, produce, and utensil washing): Mark 7:3–4.
 "Thus he declared all foods clean". 7:19 NRSV, not found in the Matthean parallel Matthew 15:15–20.
 There is no mention of Samaritans.
 Jesus heals using his fingers and spit at the same time: 7:33; cf. 8:23, Luke 11:20, John 9:6, Matthew 8:16.
 Jesus lays his hands on a blind man twice in curing him: 8:23–25; cf. 5:23, 16:18, Acts 6:6, Acts 9:17, Acts 28:8, laying on of hands.
 Jesus cites the Shema Yisrael: "Hear O Israel ..."; in the parallels of Matt 22:37–38 and Luke 10:27 the first part of the Shema is absent.
 Mark points out that the Mount of Olives is across from the Temple.
 When Jesus is arrested, a young naked man flees. A young man in a robe also appears in Mark 16:5–7, see also Secret Gospel of Mark.
 Mark does not name the High Priest.
 Witness testimony against Jesus does not agree.
 The cock crows "twice" as predicted. See also Fayyum Fragment. The other Gospels simply record, "the cock crew". Early codices 01, W, and most Western texts have the simpler version.
 Pilate's position (Governor) is not specified.
 Simon of Cyrene's sons are named.
 A summoned centurion is questioned.
 The women ask each other who will roll away the stone
 A young man sits on the "right side".
 Mark is the only canonical gospel with significant various alternative endings. Most of the contents of the traditional "Longer Ending" are found in other New Testament texts and are not unique to Mark, see Mark 16#Longer ending of Mark (verses 9–20), the one significant exception being 16:18b ("and if they drink any deadly thing, it shall not hurt them"), which is unique to Mark.

See also

 Acts of the Apostles (genre)
 Apocalyptic literature
 Gospel harmony
 Gospel of Mark (intertextuality)
 List of Gospels
 List of omitted Bible verses
 Sanhedrin Trial of Jesus (reference to Mark)
 Secret Gospel of Mark
 Textual variants in the Gospel of Mark
 Two-source hypothesis

Notes

References

Citations

Bibliography

Further reading

External links

Online translations of the Gospel of Mark
 Bible Gateway 35 languages/50 versions at GospelCom.net
 Unbound Bible 100+ languages/versions at Biola University
 Online Bible at gospelhall.org
 Early Christian Writings: Mark in numerous English translations, on-line scholarly resources
 Mark on Wikisource (King James version)
  Various versions

Related articles
 Hist. Eccl. 3.39
 Mark's Gospel in 40 short studies
 A Brief Introduction to Mark
 Resources for the Book of Mark at The Text This Week
 An Online Textual Commentary on the Greek Gospels by Wieland Willker, including detailed text-critical discussion of the 300 most important variants of the Greek text (PDF, 411 pages) and the variant endings (PDF, 17 pages).
 Catholic Commentary on Sacred Scripture Gospel of Mark, Author Dr. Mary Healy

 
New Testament books
Works of uncertain authorship
Texts in Koine Greek
Synoptic Gospels